Ethridge may refer to:
Ethridge, Kentucky
Ethridge, Montana
Ethridge, Tennessee

People with the name Ethridge
Benjamin Kane Ethridge (born 1977), American author
Chris Ethridge (1947–2012), American country rock bass guitarist
George H. Ethridge (1871–1957), justice of the Supreme Court of Mississippi
Joe Ethridge (1928–2007), American professional football player
Kamie Ethridge (born 1964), American basketball player and coach
Mark Ethridge (born 1949), American novelist, screenwriter, and communications consultant
Ray Ethridge (born 1968), American football wide receiver
Robbie Ethridge (born 1955), American anthropologist and author
Roe Ethridge (born 1969), American postmodernist commercial and art photographer
William N. Ethridge (1912–1971), chief justice of the Supreme Court of Mississippi

See also
Ethridge House (disambiguation)
Etheridge (disambiguation)
 Ettridge (disambiguation)